Wind power in Croatia has been growing since the first wind farm was installed in the country in 2004. During 2021, the energy produced from wind farms amounted to 1,904 GWh.

History
The first wind farm was installed on the island of Pag in 2004. In 2006 another farm opened near Šibenik. On July 1, 2007 the Croatian Government enacted five bylaws on incentives to electricity generation from renewable resources, including feed-in tariffs.

Currently in Croatia there's a total of 364 wind turbines which generate total of 970.15 MW or electric energy, but with new turbines coming on-line all the time, it is expected that by mid 2020s total installed power will reach 3,200 MW, As of early 2020 Croatia generates around 28.3% renewable energy, Government hopes Croatia could generate around 37.5% renewable energy from wind and solar by 2030 and has adopted new strategy to achieve that target. By the end of 2021 renewable energy in Croatia is expected to generate around 1060 MW from Wind and Solar alone or around 32% of all energy consumption from renewable energy source, Croatia exceeded EU's renewable energy targets and exceed that by a wide margin. In 2020 country generated 28.3% of all its energy from the renewable sources of energy, installed capacity at the end of 2020 includes 89 MW Solar farms and these are set to double in 2021 to 184 MW installed capacity, 803.1 MW Wind farm are set to increase to at least 875 MW by end of 2021, and other sources such as biomass and other sources will exceed 2020 figure of total 3,226 MW installed renewable energy generation by significant margin. 
At present rate of growth and planned investments over next 5-7 year period, energy generated from Wind and solar should easily reach 40% of total energy consumption in Croatia with 50% highly probable, achieving targets set by Germany, Sweden, Norway, Denmark, Finland and Austria. Although Croatian Government has set modest targets in terms of renewable energy share of total energy consumption, initially 20% by 2020 and now modest 37.5% by 2030 or 54% by 2050, the country is rapidly approaching targets set for 2050, at current rate of expansion of renewable sources in Croatia, it is quite possible by 2035 Croatia will meet its 2050 targets, some 15 years ahead.

List of wind farms

See also

Renewable energy in the European Union
Renewable energy development
Energy in Croatia
Renewable energy by country

References

External links